Avzin-e Fereydun (also Romanized as Āvzīn-e Fereydūn; also known as Āvzīn and Owzīn) is a village in Howmeh Rural District, in the Central District of Gilan-e Gharb County, Kermanshah Province, Iran. At the 2006 census, its population was 89, in 21 families.

References 

Populated places in Gilan-e Gharb County